Tractus de usu flagrorum in re Medica et Veneria is a 1639 treatise by Henricus Meibomius (1590–1655). The English title is A Treatise on the Use of Flogging in Medicine and Venery. It was published by the English publisher Edmund Curll.

It is the earliest printed work on the subject,  giving accounts of a number of examples. David Savran declared it was the authoritative text on the subject for two hundred years. In it the author, among other things, “rejoice[s]” to know that when someone doing flogging for sexual gratification was found in Germany, they would be burned alive.

References

External links
English translation  of the 1718 edition: A treatise of the use of flogging in venerial affairs: also of the office of the loins and reins / by John Henry Meibomius; made English from the Latin original by a physician. To which is added A Treatise of Hermaphrodites (by Giles Jacob). Publisher: E. Curll, London

1639 books
Medical manuals
Whipping
BDSM literature
17th-century Latin books
Books about flagellation